George Cavendish (26 August 1766 – 13 February 1849), styled The Honourable from 1792, was an Anglo-Irish politician.

Cavendish was the son of Sir Henry Cavendish, 2nd Baronet and Sarah Bradshaw, who was created Baroness Waterpark in 1792. He served in the Irish House of Commons as the Member of Parliament for St Johnstown between 1790 and 1797, before representing Cavan Borough between 1798 and its disenfranchisement in 1800. He later served as Secretary to the Lords of the Treasury of Ireland.

On 26 February 1803, Cavendish married Letitia Catherine Caulfeild, daughter of James Caulfeild. Following her death in 1805, he married secondly Catherine Smyth, daughter of Ralph Smyth, on 15 November 1807.

References

1766 births
1849 deaths
18th-century Anglo-Irish people
George
Irish MPs 1790–1797
Irish MPs 1798–1800
Younger sons of barons
Younger sons of baronets
Members of the Parliament of Ireland (pre-1801) for County Cavan constituencies
Members of the Parliament of Ireland (pre-1801) for County Longford constituencies